There have been two baronetcies created for persons with the surname Sullivan, both in the Baronetage of the United Kingdom. One creation is extant as of 2010.

The Sullivan Baronetcy, of Thames Ditton in the County of Surrey, was created in the Baronetage of the United Kingdom on 22 May 1804 for the writer and MP Richard Sullivan. The third and sixth Baronets were Admirals in the Royal Navy. The ninth, and as of 2010 present holder of the baronetcy, does not use his title.

The Sullivan Baronetcy, of Garryduff in the County of Cork, was created in the Baronetage of the United Kingdom on 29 December 1881 for the Irish lawyer and politician Edward Sullivan. He was Lord Chancellor of Ireland from 1883 to 1885. The title became extinct on the death of the third Baronet in 1937.

Sullivan baronets, of Thames Ditton (1804)
Sir Richard Joseph Sullivan, 1st Baronet (1752–1806)
Sir Henry Sullivan, 2nd Baronet (1785–1814)
Sir Charles Sullivan, 3rd Baronet (1789–1862), Admiral of the Blue
Sir Charles Sullivan, 4th Baronet (1820–1865)
Sir Edward Robert Sullivan, 5th Baronet (1826–1899)
Sir Francis William Sullivan, 6th Baronet (1834–1906)
Sir Frederick Sullivan, 7th Baronet (1865–1954)
Sir Richard Benjamin Magniac Sullivan, 8th Baronet (1906–1977)
Sir Richard Arthur Sullivan, 9th Baronet (born 1931)

The heir apparent to the baronetcy is Charles Merson Sullivan (born 1962), eldest son of the 9th Baronet.

His heir apparent is his only son, Alun David Sullivan (born 1998).

Sullivan baronets, of Garryduff (1881)

Sir Edward Sullivan, 1st Baronet (1822–1885)
Sir Edward Sullivan, 2nd Baronet (1852–1928)
Sir William Sullivan, 3rd Baronet (1860–1937)

Notes

References
Kidd, Charles, Williamson, David (editors). Debrett's Peerage and Baronetage (1990 edition). New York: St Martin's Press, 1990, 

Baronetcies in the Baronetage of the United Kingdom
Extinct baronetcies in the Baronetage of the United Kingdom